Lieutenant Colonel Kishen Singh was a former national polo player from India. He was a member of the Indian polo team that won the World Cup in 1954 at Deauville France. He was awarded Arjuna Award  in 1963. He is from Jodhpur in Rajasthan.  He later converted his residence into a heritage hotel called Polo Heritage, which is currently run by his family. His two sons have also played polo for India.

References  
Polo in India

Indian polo players
Polo players from Rajasthan
Recipients of the Arjuna Award
People from Jodhpur
Rajasthani people
Military personnel from Rajasthan